Mother (translit. Mat, also released as 1905) is a 1955 Soviet drama film directed by Mark Donskoy and based on the 1906 eponymous novel by Maxim Gorky. It was entered into the 1956 Cannes Film Festival.

Cast
 Vera Maretskaya as Pelagea Nilovna Vlassovna, the mother
 Aleksey Batalov as Pavel Vlassov
 Tatyana Piletskaya as Sasha
  as Andrei Nakhodka
  as Nikolai Ivanovich
  as Sophia Ivanovna
  as Rybin
  as Nikolai Suzov
 Nikifor Kolofidin as Mr. Vlassov
 Ivan Neganov (as I. Neganov) as Agent
  as Vesoshukov

References

External links

1955 films
1955 drama films
1950s Russian-language films
Soviet drama films
Films directed by Mark Donskoy
Films based on Russian novels
Films based on works by Maxim Gorky